Gerrit Horsten (16 April 1900 – 23 July 1961) was a Dutch footballer. He competed in the men's tournament at the 1924 Summer Olympics.

References

External links

1900 births
1961 deaths
Dutch footballers
Netherlands international footballers
Olympic footballers of the Netherlands
Footballers at the 1924 Summer Olympics
Footballers from Tilburg
Association football midfielders
SBV Vitesse players
Willem II (football club) players
Dutch football managers
SBV Vitesse managers